The 2017 Estonian Football Winter Tournament or the 2017 EJL Jalgpallihalli Turniir is the fourth edition of the annual tournament in Estonia.  This tournament is divided into five groups of 6 teams.

Groups

Group A

Group B

Group C

Group D

Group E

Group F

References
Home page

Winter
Estonian Football Winter Tournament